Diana Urban (born April 22, 1949) is an American politician who served in the Connecticut House of Representatives from the 43rd district from 2001 to 2019.

References

1949 births
Living people
Members of the Connecticut House of Representatives
Connecticut Republicans
Connecticut Democrats